Chandhamama is a 2013 Tamil language film written and directed by R. Radhakrishnan. The film stars Karunas, Shweta Prasad and Harish Kalyan. The film released on 1 March 2013 to negative reviews.

Cast

 Karunas as Santhanakrishnan (Chandamama)
 Shweta Prasad as Mary
 Harish Kalyan as Yuvan
 Ilavarasu as Santhanakrishnan's father
 Sujatha as Santhanakrishnan's mother
 G. M. Kumar as J. Kanthan
 Mohan Ram as Church Father
 Madhan Bob
 R. Sundarrajan
 Rahasya
 M. S. Bhaskar
 Srikanth Deva as himself
 Sridhar as himself ("Narayana")

Soundtrack
Music was composed by Srikanth Deva.

Release
A reviewer noted "on the whole an ordinary effort, delivering nothing new or entertaining to the audience."

References

External links
 

2013 films
2010s Tamil-language films